Şəybəy (also, Shaybey and Sheybey) is a village in the Jabrayil Rayon of Azerbaijan.

History 
In 1993, the village was captured by the Armed Forces of Armenia. On 3 October 2020, the village was reportedly captured by the Azerbaijani Armed Forces during the fighting in Karabakh. It's currently uninhabited.

References 

Populated places in Jabrayil District